The Duchy of Livonia ( or ; ; ; ;), also referred to as Polish Livonia or Livonia was a territory of the Grand Duchy of Lithuania and later the Polish–Lithuanian Commonwealth that existed from 1561 to 1621. It corresponds to the present-day areas of northern Latvia and southern Estonia.

History
Livonia had been part of the Grand Duchy of Lithuania from 1561, since the Livonian Order was secularized by the Union of Vilnius and the Livonian Confederation dissolved during the Livonian Wars. Part of Livonia formed the Duchy of Courland and Semigallia while the south-west part of today's Estonia and north-east part of today's Latvia, covering what are now Vidzeme and Latgale, were ceded to the Grand Duchy of Lithuania.

In 1566, it was declared the Duchy of Livonia according to the Treaty of Union between the landowners of Livonia and authorities of Lithuania; Jan Hieronimowicz Chodkiewicz became the first Governor of the Duchy (1566–1578) in Sigulda Castle. It was a province of Grand Duchy of Lithuania until 1569. After the Union of Lublin in 1569, it became a joint domain of the Polish Crown and the Grand Duchy.

The larger part of the Duchy was conquered by Swedish Empire during the Polish–Swedish wars, and their gains were recognized in the Truce of Altmark in 1629. The Commonwealth retained southeastern parts of the Wenden Voivodeship, renamed to Inflanty Voivodeship with the capital in Daugavpils (Dyneburg), until the first Partition of Poland in 1772, when it was annexed by Catherine the Great's Russian Empire. The title "Grand Duke of Livonia" was added to the grand title of later Russian Emperors.

Administrative divisions
 Dorpat Voivodeship (Dorpat) from 1598 to the 1620s
 Parnawa Voivodeship (Parnawa) from 1598 to the 1620s
 Wenden Voivodeship (Wenden) from 1598 to the 1620s

See also
 Inflanty Voivodeship from the 1620s to 1772
 Bishopric of Ösel-Wiek

References

External links
 October 2009+06:08:36 Duchy of Livonia

 
History of Lithuania (1569–1795)
1561 establishments in Europe
1561 establishments in Lithuania
1621 disestablishments in the Polish–Lithuanian Commonwealth
States and territories disestablished in the 1620s